Lee Daggett (born 1 October 1982) is an English former cricketer who played for Warwickshire, Leicestershire and Northants as a  right-arm medium-pace bowler and a right-handed batsman.

Career
Daggett started his cricketing career with Durham MCC University in 2003, playing occasional games against first-class cricketing teams before representing a combined team of British Universities against a touring New Zealand line-up the following year. He graduated from Durham University (John Snow College) in 2005. Having impressed Warwickshire with his performances during 2005, the team signed him for the 2006 season, in which he played occasionally as the number 11 batsman in the line-up. He played frequently in the Second XI, and retained his place in the first team for the 2007 season. He was loaned to Leicestershire for the final month of the 2008 season, and was released by Warwickshire at the end of that season.

He joined Northants for the 2009 season, and played for them in all three formats of the game. In 2013, he was a part of the Northants team which won the Friends Life T20, taking the wicket of Zander de Bruyn in the final. 
During his cricketing career he studied physiotherapy at Salford University and he retired from cricket at the end of the 2013 season, in order to take up a job as physiotherapist at Northampton Saints Rugby Union team.

Daggett's father Peter was a Lancashire League player for Ramsbottom, while Daggett himself has played over 100 games in the Lancashire League, since making his debut in the competition at the age of fifteen, playing in the Worsley Cup final of 2005.

Career best performances
as of 24 January 2016

References

External links

1982 births
Living people
Alumni of John Snow College, Durham
Alumni of the University of Salford
British Universities cricketers
Cricketers from Bury, Greater Manchester
Durham MCCU cricketers
English cricketers
Leicestershire cricketers
Northamptonshire cricketers
Warwickshire cricketers